Liberation is the second album by Irish chamber pop band the Divine Comedy, released on 18 August 1993 by Setanta Records. Following the unsuccessful Fanfare for the Comic Muse, the group started improvising on their new album which was recorded in Fundamental, London in March 1993. Although it was the band's second album, the band's leader, Neil Hannon, often refers to it as the first, due to the stylistic differences from their debut album, Fanfare for the Comic Muse.

Background

Production
The album was recorded over the space of twelve days in March, 1993 by Hannon and Darren Allison. Hannon played most of the instruments on the album, while Allison was the recording engineer and drummer. It includes instruments like harpsichord, violin, viola, cello, French horn, and a Hammond B3 organ.

Composition
Liberation includes a mixture of pop and art pop music. Several of the album tracks are inspired by or refer to works of literature: "Bernice Bobs Her Hair" is based on the short story of the same name by F. Scott Fitzgerald; "Three Sisters" is about the play of the same name by Anton Chekhov; "Lucy" is an amalgamation of three of the Lucy poems by William Wordsworth; "Timewatching" is inspired by the popular song "When I Fall In Love"; "Death of a Supernaturalist" is preceded by a quote from A Room with a View by E. M. Forster, spoken by Julian Sands and Daniel Day-Lewis and sampled from the Merchant-Ivory film of the same name. More playfully, "Festive Road" is a tribute to the children's television programme Mr Benn.

Critical reception

In a retrospective AllMusic review, Ned Raggett rated Liberation with three stars out of five, declaring it as Divine Comedy's first "full album".

Track listing
All songs written and arranged by Neil Hannon; additional lyrics on "Lucy" by William Wordsworth.

2020 Remaster Bonus Disc Liberation: Leftovers

Personnel
Per 1999 CD booklet of the ''A Secret History... The Best of the Divine Comedy.

 Neil Hannon – vocals, guitars, bass guitar, keyboards
 Darren Allison – drums, percussion
 Lucy Castle – viola, violin
 Monica Scott – cello
 Quentin Hutchinson – french horn

References

The Divine Comedy (band) albums
1993 albums
Setanta Records albums